The Two Boys (French: Les deux gosses) is a 1924 French silent film directed by Louis Mercanton and starring Jean Mercanton, André Rolane and Leslie Shaw. It was based on the 1880 novel of the same name by Pierre Decourcelle. It was remade as a sound film in 1934.

Cast

References

External links

Films directed by Louis Mercanton
French silent feature films
French black-and-white films
1920s French films